Sowiesoso (from ) is the fourth studio album by German electronic music band Cluster, released in 1976. It was Cluster's first release for Sky Records. Sowiesoso was recorded in just two days in Forst, Germany in 1976 and mixed at Conny's Studio in Wolperath.

Background
Brian Eno had worked with Dieter Moebius and Hans-Joachim Roedelius with Harmonia prior to the recording of Sowiesoso and worked with Cluster again on two albums in 1977 and 1978. The influence of the British ambient musician is clearly heard on the softer and more controlled sound of Sowiesoso. Reviewer Russ Curry describes the album as "a fully realized marriage of electronic sounds with a pastoral warmth." Kevin Warwick of the Chicago Reader noted that the album's focus on "ambient electronic soundscapes" represented a divergence from the "motorik grooves" explored by Cluster's krautrock contemporaries.

Release
Sowiesoso was Cluster's first release for the label Sky Records. Sky would serve as Cluster's label until 1986, by which time the label had released albums recorded by the band with Brian Eno, solo recordings, and three albums by the duo of Moebius and former Cluster member and frequent engineer and producer Conny Plank.

The album was first reissued on CD by Sky Records in 1992. It has also been reissued by the American label Gyroscope in 1996, the San Francisco-based Water label in 2006 and the Japanese label Captain Trip Records in 2007.

Reception

Julian Cope included Sowiesoso in his "Krautrock Top 50" list. For The Quietus, Euan Andrews called the album "an electronic suite to pastoral living [...] which remains unparalleled in its depiction of another blissful green world. Synthetic birds chirrup, bells chime and life is easy and good."

Track listing
All songs written by Hans-Joachim Roedelius and Dieter Moebius.

Side one
"Sowiesoso" – 8:10 (on most CD reissues this track is shortened with a running time of 7:17)
"Halwa" – 2:47
"Dem Wanderer" – 3:47
"Umleitung" – 3:25

Side two
"Zum Wohl" – 6:50
"Es War Einmal" – 5:25
"In Ewigkeit" – 7:10

Personnel
Dieter Moebius – keyboards, percussion, vocals
Hans-Joachim Roedelius – keyboards, percussion, vocals
Conny Plank - producer

References

Further reading
 

1976 albums
Cluster (band) albums
Albums produced by Conny Plank